Ursula Reuter Christiansen (born 13 February 1943 in Trier, Germany) created work, whether it was painting or filmmaking, that showed examples of mythological symbolism.

Biography
Ursula Reuter Christiansen studied literature at the Philipp University in Marburg, Germany. Beginning in 1965, she studied sculpture under Joseph Beuys at the Düsseldorf Academy of Fine Arts.

After moving to Denmark with her husband, Henning Christiansen, in 1969, Reuter Christiansen started to move her focus from sculpture and literature to painting and filmmaking. Her work proved to be influenced by societal pressures she felt as a mother and wife and the feminist art movement activities from about 1970 in Denmark.

Later in 1970, Reuter Christiansen released a movie called The Executioner, in which she narrated a story about a woman whose life was changed after giving birth to her husband's child. Although she received a lot of critique for her film by those that viewed it, it was a direct use of Reuter Christiansen’s own experience as a woman, a wife and a mother.

Beginning in 1997, Reuter Christiansen trained at the Royal Danish Academy of Fine Arts in Copenhagen. She still presently generates various works of art, such as paintings, ceramics and film, which mostly include ideas of marriage and close relationships.

She was awarded an Eckersberg Medal in 2011.

Work
Ursula Reuter Christiansen has had many works of art displayed in various museums. Some of her most famous pieces include:
 Marriage (1978)
 A Never Ceasing Voice (1975)
 Money (1975)
 The Woman's ABC (1971)
 Jungle (1968)

References

1943 births
Living people
Danish film directors
German women artists
People from Trier
University of Marburg alumni
Kunstakademie Düsseldorf alumni
Academic staff of the Royal Danish Academy of Fine Arts
Recipients of the Eckersberg Medal
German women academics
Neo-expressionist artists